Sergey Belosheev (born April 27, 1986, in Yevpatoria, Ukrainian SSR, Soviet Union) is Ukrainian, since 2015 Russian draughts player (Russian, Brazilian and International draughts), two time world champion in draughts-64, seven time champion of Ukraine  at Russian draughts (2006-2010, 2012, 2013). International grandmaster (GMI) since 2005. He graduated Tavrida National V.I. Vernadsky University.

Sport achievements
World champion (Brazilian and Russian draughts)

1st place 2009, 2015
2nd place 2004, 2006, 2011
3 place 2008 and 2018.European champion (Brazilian and Russian draughts)
2nd place 2014

Blits
1st place 2012
2nd place 2010 and 2016

Rapid
2nd place 2010 and 2016
3 place 2010 (rapid).

Ukrainian national champion (Russian draughts) 1st place (2006-2010, 2012, 2013), 3 place 2004.

Russian national champion (Russian draughts) - 2nd place (2015, 2017), 3 place 2016.

Thailand Open Jomtien 2018 (International draughts) - 1st place.

References

External links 
Чемпiони та призери чемпонатiв України з шашок-64 серед чоловiкiв 
Profile, KNDB

1986 births
Living people
Ukrainian draughts players
Russian draughts players
Players of international draughts
Players of Russian draughts
Players of Brazilian draughts
Ukrainian emigrants to Russia
Naturalised citizens of Russia